Rideau Carleton Raceway is a Canadian horse racing and gambling complex located at 4837 Albion Road in Ottawa, Ontario. The facility began operation in 1962 and specialises in Standardbred harness racing.

In 2000, the venue introduced slot machines, under the authority of the Ontario Lottery and Gaming Corporation (OLG) which were expected to draw annual revenue of $130 million. The site includes a restaurant and hosts musical performances. 

Rideau Carleton is also the site of the Gloucester Fair (now the Capital Fair) since 1998. The raceway provides facilities for numerous charitable fundraisers and hosts annual events for several embassies.

The operations at the Raceway are currently run by Hard Rock Hotels and Casinos, which bought the facility in September 2017. Hard Rock holds 51% of the stock.

Harness racing
The brainchild of James William Baskin, Rideau Carleton opened for racing on 1 September 1962. The facilities were developed by architect and building director D'Arcy Helmer, who had previously designed several hospitals and schools in the Ottawa Valley but who had never previously visited a racetrack. Helmer drew his main inspiration from Scioto Downs in Columbus, Ohio. The facilities also included 12 fireproof barns plus 96 tack rooms and a restaurant for the horsepeople. Despite a successful opening, the racetrack was then plagued by bad weather, which contributed to the track going into receivership at the end of its first season. Overcoming this rocky start, Rideau Carleton celebrate its fiftieth anniversary in 2012.

The racetrack at Rideau Carleton is a five-eighths mile oval with a track speed rating of 1:57.4, about average for tracks of the same dimensions. In 2017, the track had 91 live race dates scheduled; every Sunday evening except Christmas Eve plus Thursday evenings from April through October. It is open year-round for off-track betting and has simulcast facilities for betting on thoroughbred and standardbred racing at other racetracks.

Most races at Rideau Carleton are for smaller purses of under $10,000. However, the track does feature several legs of the Ontario Sires Stakes program in August. Until 2012, the track also hosted the Des Smith Classic. In the 2006 renewal, featuring several of the fastest pacers of the time, Lis Mara set a Canadian record on a -mile track of 1:49.3. The record was broken in the 2011 renewal by Lis Mara's brother Lisagain, who paced the mile in 1:49.2. Although this is no longer the Canadian record, it still stands as the Rideau Carleton track record.

References

Notes

External links
rideaucarletoncasino.com - official website

1962 establishments in Ontario
Casinos in Ontario
Horse racing venues in Ontario
Harness racing venues in Canada
Sports venues in Ottawa
Sports venues completed in 1962
Hard Rock Cafe
Festival venues in Canada